St Columb Canal sometimes referred to as Edyvean's Canal, was an abortive canal scheme in Cornwall, England, designed for the carriage of sea sand for use as manure. It was authorised in 1773, and part of it may have been briefly used around 1780.

History
The canal was first proposed by the Cornish engineer, John Edyvean in 1773. His idea was to run a canal from Mawgan Porth through parishes inland and to return to Newquay. Its purpose was to import sea-sand, seaweed and stone for manuring to improve land. Edyvean obtained an Act of Parliament on 1 April 1773, which authorised a  canal, although it appears that the clerk must have misheard what was said, as the plans were for a  canal. The engineer John Harris gave evidence to a parliamentary committee to secure the Act for the canal, the cost of which was estimated to be between £5,000 and £6,000. Edyvean planned to finance the costs himself.

Work started in 1773, and two sections were  built, each with an inclined plane to connect it to the foreshore, but the canal was never completed. The northern section, from Trenance Point at Mawgan Porth, which followed the  contour, terminated a little short of Whitewater, where it was fed by the River Menalhyl. Edyvean advertised for 50 able-bodied men in 1776, who would be paid 14 pence (6p) per day to dig the canal. Edyvean appears to have spent most of his own fortune on the project, and his sister's money as well. Realising that he was unlikely to recoup much of it, the project was abandoned, and he died in the 1780s.

An account of the operation of one of the inclined planes was published in A. Rees's Cyclopaedia in 1805. It described a steep inclined plane covered in planks. The square tub-boats were brought to the end of the canal, where the front end of the boat was attached to a hinge, and the back end was attached to ropes. The ropes passed onto a wheel and drum, which was operated by a horse-gin. As the boat tipped up, the cargo of stones rolled down the planks to the beach below. The wheel and drum were also used to draw boxes containing coal or sand up from the beach, to be loaded into the boats.

In 1829, Richard Retallick, a businessman from Liskeard, revived the idea of a canal from St Columb to Mawgan Porth, which was part of a larger project to make the Porth suitable for use as a harbour during the summer months. He issued a prospectus, but no further progress was made.

Route
The canal was built as a 'tub-boat' canal which used inclined planes instead of locks to change levels. The northern section began at Trenance Point, on the cliffs to the north of Mawgan Porth, and followed the course of the Menalhyl Valley towards the east. Because it was at a higher level than the river, it had to pass a number of side streams, which was achieved by building large loops away from the river, in order to maintain the level of the canal. Most of the route is clearly visible on the 1888 Ordnance Survey map, and several sections are still visible on modern maps. The first loop was towards Trenance, now covered by housing in Mawgan Porth, but the  contour shows its approximate route. To the east of Mawgan Porth was another loop, around a series of springs and a stream, which is still visible near Merlin Farm, the historical location of Moreland. To the north of Retorrick Mill, a track follows the course for some distance, after which there was another loop to accommodate the stream that flows south to join the Menalhyl upstream of the mill. After crossing the road from Little Lanherne to Lower Lanherne, the tracks around New Farm and Higher Lanvean, to the north of the Lanvean Bottoms Nature Reserve again follow the route of the canal.

The route continued to the east, passing just to the south of the buildings at Trevedras, to cross the Lower Denzell to Bolingey road. A semi-circular track shows the route, which is picked up by the bridleway to the east of Bolingey, after it crosses another side stream. The canal reached Menadews Plantation, and continued along its northern edge, where it terminated, about  short of Whitewater.

The southern section began at Lusty Glaze, where the site of the incline down the cliffs is still clearly visible. It headed east, before sweeping to the south and then the north around Porth Veor and Higher Porth, now both part of Newquay. From Porth, it turned to the east, following the  contour. Its course is marked by several field boundaries as it approaches St Columb Minor. An original bridge still carries the footpath from St Columb Minor to Penrose over the course of the canal. It turned to the south-east to reach Priory Road, and then continued to the east towards Rialton Mill. Near the junction of Priory Road and the A3059 Rialton Road, it turned to the south, to end where the minor road to Rialton Barton leaves the A3059.

An archaeological watching brief was carried out in 2008 when South West Water had to replace a sewage pipeline at Porth. A section through the canal revealed that although preliminary excavation work to create a terrace had been done, the canal had not been completed at that location.

See also

Canals of Great Britain
History of the British canal system
Bude Canal (also by John Edyvean)

Bibliography

References

Canals in Cornwall
Canals opened in 1779
Industrial archaeological sites in Cornwall